Coopes is a surname. Notable people with the name include:

 Jenny Coopes (born 1945), Australian political cartoonist, illustrator, and painter
 Rachael Coopes, Australian actress

See also
 Coop (disambiguation)
 Coops, a surname
 Coope, a surname
 Coop (surname)
 Cooper (surname)